The 2001–02 season of the Slovak Second Football League (also known as 2. liga) was the ninth season of the league since its establishment. It began on 28 July 2001 and ended on 8 June 2002.

League standing

See also
2001–02 Slovak Superliga

References
 Jindřich Horák, Lubomír Král: Encyklopedie našeho fotbalu, Libri 1997

External links
 Tables and results at www.liga.cz

2. Liga (Slovakia) seasons
2001–02 in Slovak football
Slovak